This article refers to the Woodlawn Cemetery in Canandaigua, New York. For other uses, see Woodlawn Cemetery (disambiguation).

Woodlawn Cemetery is a historic cemetery located at Canandaigua, Ontario County, New York, United States.

In June 1884, officers and trustees were elected and the original  of land were purchased from Lucius Wilcox.

The Woodlawn Cemetery chapel was dedicated in 1910. In 2014 it was listed on the National Register of Historic Places.

Notable burials
 Myron Holley Clark (1806–1892) – Governor of New York
 Crystal Eastman (1881–1928)
 Francis Granger (1792–1868) – Member of the U.S. House of Representatives and U.S. Postmaster General; candidate for U.S. Vice President (1836)
 Gideon Granger (1767–1822) – New York State Senator and U.S. Postmaster General
 Barney Kessel (1923–2004) – legendary Jazz Guitarist
 Stanton Davis Kirkham (1868–1944) – author"sandys jazz revival" 1975
 Elbridge Gerry Lapham (1814–1890) – Member of the U.S. House of Representatives and United States Senate
 John Raines (1840–1909) – New York State Senator and member of the U.S. House of Representatives
 Frederick Ferris Thompson (1836–1899) – notable banker, co-founder of predecessor banks to Citibank and JP Morgan Chase
 Mary Clark Thompson (1835–1923) – philanthropist
 Edward Francis Winslow (1837–1914), a Civil War general, who died at Sonnenberg while visiting Mary Clark Thompson and her banker husband, Frederick Ferris Thompson

See also
 List of cemeteries in New York
 National Register of Historic Places listings in Ontario County, New York

References

External links

 

Cemeteries in Ontario County, New York
Cemeteries on the National Register of Historic Places in New York (state)
1884 establishments in New York (state)
Canandaigua, New York
National Register of Historic Places in Ontario County, New York